Adanggaman is a 2000 historical drama film directed by Roger Gnoan M'Bala. It was an international co-production between the Ivory Coast, Burkina Faso, Switzerland, Italy and France.

Plot
At Adanggaman's court, Ossei makes friends with a healer/seer, who was captured as a boy from his village/people by Adanggaman's empire in the 17th century. He heals some wounds that Ossei gained when travelling to Adanggaman, and reveals through his fortune-telling abilities that the future of all in the empire would be bleak for a long time, subject to slavery and oppression. The healer sees his daughter at the court (Naka), who doesn't acknowledge him initially, but recalls her childhood with him guiding her as his only daughter. The seer protests to King Adanngaman, who in turn for his perceived insolence, orders him and Ossei to be sold as slaves. The healer dies whilst in captivity, overcome by disbelief, grief and abandonment.

In the end, Ossei leaves Naka, after the two escape, become close friends, and form a household. He goes travelling, to forge a new life, but is captured by soldiers of Adangamaan's court and thus prepped for sale into slavery. He is sold to Europeans, who transport him to the Americas via the Middle Passage, and is renamed John Stanford by a wealthy plantation owner. He dies at age 70, having five children with a slave woman. King Adangaaman is captured by his aides whilst drunk from rum, and in turn sold to Europeans. He becomes a slave in St. Louis, and is a cook to Europeans there, being given the name Walter Brown. He dies in 1698 from tuberculosis.

Cast
 Rasmane Ouedraogo ... Adanggaman
 Albertine N'Guessan ... Mo Akassi
 Ziable Honoré Goore Bi ... Ossei
 Bintou Bakayoko ... Ehua
 Nicole Suzis Menyeng ... Adjo
 Mireille Andrée Boti ... Mawa
 Tie Dijian Patrick ... Kanga
 Lou Nadège Blagone ... Safo Aboua
 Didier Grandidier ... Bangalajan
 Mylène-Perside Boti Kouame ... Naka
 Étienne Goheti Bi Gore ... Poro
 Zie Soro ... Sory
 Sie Lou Chantal ... Amazon
 Sokpo Germaine ... Amazon
 Bi Cécile ... Amazon

Awards
In 2000, Andanggaman won the Best Actor and Special Jury Award at the Amiens International Film Festival. The following year it won the Special Jury Award at the Marrakech International Film Festival and the awards for Best Actress and Best Cinematography at the Ouagadougou Panafrican Film and Television Festival.

Bibliography
 Africans Making Slaves of Africans, Elvis Mitchell, The New York Times, 2001 July 11
 Adanggaman (2000), Allmovie, Todd Kristel, Access date: 2002 May 6
 Olivier Barlet, “A Reflection on Power: Interview of Olivier Barlet with Roger Gnoan M’Bala.” Africiné, 1 Sept. 1999

References

External links
 
 Filmic Discomfort: Adanggaman and the Legacy of Slavery in West Africa

2000 films
Bambara-language films
Ivorian drama films
Films about royalty
Films about slavery
Films set in Africa
2000s French-language films
Films set in the 1680s
2000 drama films
Films set in pre-colonial sub-Saharan Africa
Burkinabé drama films
French drama films
Swiss drama films
2000s French films
2000 multilingual films
French multilingual films
Swiss multilingual films